The Suid-Afrikaanse Akademie vir Wetenskap en Kuns (SAAWK) (literally South African Academy for Science and Arts) is a multidisciplinary organization dedicated to promoting science, technology and the arts in Afrikaans, as well as promoting the use and quality of Afrikaans. The Hertzog Prize is awarded annually by the academy for high-quality literary work, while the Havenga prize is awarded annually for original research in the sciences.

Origin 
The initiative for the founding of the SAAWK came from General J. B. M. Hertzog who championed the Dutch-Afrikaans language. He suggested "dat een lichaam in 't leven worde geroepen ter bevordering van de Hollandse taal en letteren in Zuid-Afrika" (that one organisation be established to promote the Dutch language and literature in South Africa).

On 2 July 1909, the first 30 members of the body gathered to form the "Zuid-Afrikaanse Akademie voor Taal, Letteren en Kunst" (South African  Academy for Language, Literature and Art). The aim of the academy was "The enforcement and promotion of Dutch Language and Literature, and of the South African History, Archeology and Art", with an addendum that Dutch implied both Dutch and Afrikaans, as both languages were common in South Africa at the time.

The name of the Academy was changed to the Suid-Afrikaanse Akademie vir Wetenskap en Kuns in 1942 when a "science and technology" faculty was created.

Since then, it has been responsible for the establishment of, among others, the Simon van der Stel Foundation and the Africa Institute. Furthermore, the Academy strives to promote interest in South African history, antiquities, art and Afrikaans language and literature. The Academy has become known over the years because of the regular awarding of literary prizes (of which the Hertzog Prize is best known) and other prestigious awards such as the N. P. van Wyk Louw medal.

Honorary membership of the Academy is regarded as an exceptionally high honour, although it is not accompanied by any prize or prize money. A person considered for honorary membership of the Academy is nominated in recognition of exceptional service to South Africa, the Afrikaans language, or to the Academy in particular.

Change in status 
In the early 1990s it was decided that a new organisation should be created to be the representative national science academy for South Africa. To this end the president of the Foundation for Research and Development invited the Royal Society of South Africa (RSSAf), the Suid-Afrikaanse Akademie vir Wetenskap en Kuns (SAAWK) and the Science and Engineering Academy of South Africa (SEASA) to jointly plan a new academy. This led to the creation of The Academy of Science of South Africa (ASSAf) in 1995. Act 67 of 2001, the ASSAf Statute, revoked the SAAWK statute and ASSAf became the only national science academy of South Africa.

In response to this the Suid-Afrikaanse Akademie vir Wetenskap en Kuns registered in 2002 as a Nonprofit company.

Awards 
Prizes, medals, awards of honorary membership and bursaries, as awarded by the Academy, are listed below.

Prizes 
 Hertzog Prize
 Eugène Marais Prize
 Scheepers Prize for Youth Literature
 SA Academy Prize for Translated Work
 Alba Bouwer Prize for Children's Literature
 Elsabe Steenberg Prize for Translated Children's and Youth Literature in Afrikaans
 C.J. Langenhoven prize for linguistics
 Gustav Preller Prize for Literature and Literary Criticism
 Toon van den Heever prize for jurisprudence
 DF du Toit-Malherbe Prize for Genealogical Research
 Stals prize
 Totius Prize for Theology and the study of the basics of the Bible
 Samuel Edward Mqhayi prize
 Olive Schreiner Prize for English Literature
 Havenga Prize
 Albert Strating Prize for Preventative Medicine
 FARMOVS Prize for Pharmacology and Drug Development
 Douw Greeff Prize
 Esther Greeff Prize
 Louis Hiemstra Prize for Non-fiction
 Huberte Rupert Prize for Classical Music
 CL Engelbrecht prize
 Protea Book House Prize for Best History Dissertation

Medals 
 Tienie Holloway Medal for Kindergarten literature
 Markus Viljoen Medal for Journalistic Performance
 D.F. Malan medal
 Rev. Pieter van Drimmelen medal
 NP van Wyk Louw medal
 Elizabeth C. Steijn medal
 Frans du Toit Medal for Business Leadership
 Transnet Medal
 Gold Academy Medal for Natural Science and Technical Achievement
 MT Steyn Medal for Natural Science and Technical Achievement
 Senior Captain Scott Medal
 Junior Captain Scott Medal
 Christo Wiese Medal for an Emerging Entrepreneur

Awards of honorary membership 
Awards are given in the following categories:
 Contributions to Afrikaans Radio dramatisations
 Contributions to Afrikaans Television Drama and Afrikaans Documentary Television Programmes
 Contributions to the Academy
 Promotion of Scientific subjects
 Honorary membership of the Faculty of Natural Sciences and Technology

Other 
 Elisabeth Eybers bursary
 Special bursaries

See also 
Afrikaanse Woordelys en Spelreëls - Afrikaans words and spelling rules published by SAAWK
Suid-Afrikaanse Akademie vir Wetenskap en Kuns in Afrikaans Wikipedia

Sources 
Combrink, J.G.H. and Spies, J. SARA: Sakboek van regte Afrikaans (in Afrikaans), Tafelberg, Cape Town, 1994
Kapp, P.H. Draer van 'n droom: die geskiedenis van die Suid-Afrikaanse Akademie vir Wetenskap en Kuns, 1909-2009 (in Afrikaans),  Hemel & See Boeke, Hermanus, 2009
Nienaber, P.J.Op brandwag vir ons taal : die geskiedenis en werksaamhede van die Suid-Afrikaanse Akademie vir Wetenskap en Kuns (in Afrikaans), S.A. Akademie vir Wetenskap en Kuns, South Africa, 1950

References

External links 
Suid-Afrikaanse Akademie vir Wetenskap en Kuns website 

Scientific organisations based in South Africa
Science and technology in South Africa
Scientific organizations established in 1909
1909 establishments in South Africa
Academies of sciences